Morris Knolls High School (MKHS) is a four-year comprehensive public high school serving students in ninth through twelfth grades from Denville Township and most of Rockaway Township in Morris County, New Jersey, United States, operating as one of the two secondary schools of the Morris Hills Regional High School District. The school is located in Denville but has a Rockaway mailing address. The other high school in the district is Morris Hills High School.

As of the 2021–22 school year, the school had an enrollment of 1,388 students and 129.5 classroom teachers (on an FTE basis), for a student–teacher ratio of 10.7:1. There were 84 students (6.1% of enrollment) eligible for free lunch and 22 (1.6% of students) eligible for reduced-cost lunch.

As a part of the Morris Hills Regional School District's (MHRD) magnet program, Morris Knolls was approved as an International Baccalaureate (IB) world school.  The IB Diploma Program at Morris Knolls (MKIB) serves more than 80 students.

As of 2018, Morris Knolls is host to The Academy of Performing Arts, a magnet school for Morris County Vocational School District and the Morris County School of Technology (MCVTS).

Awards and recognition
The school was the 64th-ranked public high school in New Jersey out of 339 schools statewide in New Jersey Monthly magazine's September 2014 cover story on the state's "Top Public High Schools", using a new ranking methodology. The school had been ranked 79th in the state of 328 schools in 2012, after being ranked 79th in 2010 out of 322 schools listed. The magazine ranked the school 88th in 2008 out of 316 schools. The school was also ranked 71st in the magazine's September 2006 issue, which surveyed 316 schools across the state. Schooldigger.com ranked the school tied for 120th out of 381 public high schools statewide in its 2011 rankings (a decrease of 34 positions from the 2010 ranking) which were based on the combined percentage of students classified as proficient or above proficient on the mathematics (86.4%) and language arts literacy (94.2%) components of the High School Proficiency Assessment (HSPA).

For the 1996-97 school year, Morris Knolls High School was named a "Star School" by the New Jersey Department of Education, the highest honor awarded by the state.

Athletics

The Morris Knolls High School Golden Eagles participate in the Northwest Jersey Athletic Conference, which is comprised of public and private high schools in Morris, Sussex and Warren countyies, and was established following a reorganization of sports leagues in Northern New Jersey by the New Jersey State Interscholastic Athletic Association (NJSIAA). Prior to the NJSIAA's 2010 realignment, the school had competed in the Iron Hills Conference. With 1,100 students in grades 10-12, the school was classified by the NJSIAA for the 2019–20 school year as Group IV for most athletic competition purposes, which included schools with an enrollment of 1,060 to 5,049 students in that grade range. The football team competes in the Freedom Blue division of the North Jersey Super Football Conference, which includes 112 schools competing in 20 divisions, making it the nation's biggest football-only high school sports league. The school was classified by the NJSIAA as Group IV North for football for 2018–2020.

The school participates as the host school and lead agency in a joint ice hockey team with Morris Hills High School. The co-op program operates under agreements scheduled to expire at the end of the 2023–24 school year.

The baseball team has won the Morris County Tournament three times, tied for the fourth-most in tournament history, winning in 1973, 1988 and 1989.

The field hockey team won the North II Group IV state sectional title in 1976 and 1997, the North I Group IV title in 1999, 2000 and 2008, and won the Group IV state championship in 1997. The 1997 team finished the season with a 16-4-5 record after finishing the season by winning the Group IV title with a 1-0 overtime victory against Cherokee High School in the championship game.

The softball team won the Group IV state championship in 1980 (defeating Edison High School in the tournament final) and 2010 (vs. Eastern Regional High School). The 1980 team won the Group IV state title with a 5-4 victory against Edison in the championship game at Mercer County Park.

The football team has won state sectional championships in 1994 (North II, Group III), 1995 (North II, Group IV), 1996 (North II, Group III) and 2005 (North I, Group IV). The 1994 team finished the season with a 9-2 record after winning the North II Group III state sectional title with a 21-14 win against West Essex High School on a touchdown scored in the final minute of the championship game at Giants Stadium. The team won the North II Group III title in 1996 with a 36-20 win against Malcolm X Shabazz High School in the sectional championship game at Giants Stadium. The team went undefeated in 2005, winning every game including its defeat of Montclair High School in the North I, Group IV state sectional championship game. The team has been coached for over 40 years by Bill Regan Jr., who also works as a gym teacher. Morris Knolls has run the Houston split back Veer offense for Regan's entire tenure as a head coach. In October 2007 Regan joined his father, Bill Regan Sr., who was a coach at the nearby Delbarton School, as one of four coaches in Morris County history to attain 200 career wins. As a homecoming event, the Knolls football team plays against Morris Hills in an annual rivalry game at the beginning of every school year. The teams have played each other since 1972, with Morris Knolls winning 15 of the 25 games through the 2017 season. NJ.com listed the rivalry as 26th best in their 2007 list "Ranking the 31 fiercest rivalries in N.J. HS football".

In 1999, the football program suffered from a sophomore hazing scandal that was exposed in a several article series in the Daily Record and The Star-Ledger.

The ice hockey team won the Public School championship in 2005 and won the Public A title in 2014, 2019 and 2020 (as co-op with Morris Hills). The team also reached the state semifinals in 1996 losing to Brick Township, and again in 2007, losing to rival Randolph.

The wrestling team won the North I Group IV state championship in 2006.

Morris Knolls' boys' and girls' lacrosse teams were established in 2006. Both teams played as JV level teams in 2006, and varsity for 2007. In its first established varsity year, the boys team finished with an 8-9 record (including post season games). The boys team made it into the second round of the County Playoff Tournament before losing to local powerhouse, Delbarton School and the state tournament losing to Vernon Township High School in the first round.

In 2018, the Morris Knolls boys soccer team started with a record of 0-4 and went on to win the North I Group IV state championship, and ended the season with a 17-10-1 season record. The team won their first sectional title in almost 50 years when they defeated top-ranked Montclair High School by a score of 3-2 in double overtime in the tournament final.

In the 2018-2019 season, the boys indoor track and field team won the Morris County Championship as well as the NJSIAA North I Group III sectional championship.

Marching band
The Morris Knolls Marching Band is a competition ensemble that participates in the United States Scholastic Band Association (USSBA) circuit.

In 2003, 2007, 2009 and 2013, the Morris Knolls Marching Band won the USSBA Group 3 Open state championships. In 2008, the band was recognized as the all-Northeast champion.

Three years later, at the 2006 USSBA National Championships at Navy–Marine Corps Memorial Stadium in Annapolis, Maryland, Morris Knolls High School placed fourth in their group and the colorguard was recognized as Best Color Guard National Championship title in Class III.

During the 2007 season, the Morris Knolls Marching Band won the title of state champions in their group of 3 Open at the USSBA NJ state championships. The band also received the caption awards of Best Percussion, Best Colorguard, Best Effect, and Best Visual at this state competition. The same year, at the USSBA National Championships, Morris Knolls placed second in their group, also winning Best Colorguard and Best Percussion. The MKMB percussion was titled Grand National Champions, receiving the highest score out of all percussion ensembles at the competition, which included over 70 bands.

In the 2010 season, the Morris Knolls Marching Band won second place at the USSBA National Championships with a score of 95.838 in Group 2 Open, winning the caption for Best Color Guard.

Student government

The Student Government Association (SGA) of Morris Knolls is comprised of five elected Senior officers, and six elected representatives from each class. Members of the SGA organize school wide events to promote school spirit, and interact regularly with the Administration regarding school activities and improvements.

Each class has four elected officers; President, Vice President, Treasurer, and Secretary. These four officers organize individual class events such as fundraisers, and prom for the Juniors and Seniors.

Administration
The school's principal is Ryan MacNaughton. His core administration team includes three assistant principals.

Notable alumni
 Lou Benfatti (born 1971), former professional football player, New York Jets
 Neal Casal (1968-2019), guitarist and singer-songwriter with  Chris Robinson and the Black Crowes, Ryan Adams and the Cardinals, Willie Nelson, and members of the Grateful Dead
 Jermaine Eluemunor (born 1994), professional football player, Las Vegas Raiders.
 Lexie Fyfe (born 1969), professional wrestler
 Danielle Jonas (born 1986), reality television personality, Married to Jonas
 Vickie Paynter (born 1971, class of 1989), former professional tennis player
 Laura San Giacomo (born 1962), actress, Pretty Woman and Just Shoot Me!
 Charlie Zeleny, drummer, music director, and solo artist

Senior pranks 
Throughout the past twenty years there have been many students who have attempted to pull a  Senior prank, some of which that have made local news. In 2002 a few students put three chickens in the school marked one, two, and four. This was done to keep the administration busy looking for the third chicken, but in reality it never existed. In 2007 the senior and junior class started a huge food fight which caused approximately $2,780 in damage to ceiling tiles, tables, and televisions. The class of 2009's prank made the news on News 12 New Jersey and various local newspapers after students placed a dead deer in the senior bathroom with a sign on the carcass which said 'The class of 2009, the last class to make you say Oh!'". 

In 2010, after seniors from Morris Knolls released farm animals into the school's ceilings, an animal control person fell off of the ladder and tried suing the students for $1 million. All animals were safely removed from the ceilings, but the students were apprehended before classes started and brought up on charges ranging from burglary and conspiracy to animal cruelty.

References

External links
 Morris Knolls High School
 Morris Hills Regional High School District
 
 School Data for the Morris Hills Regional High School District, National Center for Education Statistics

1964 establishments in New Jersey
Denville Township, New Jersey
Educational institutions established in 1964
Magnet schools in New Jersey
Public high schools in Morris County, New Jersey
Rockaway Township, New Jersey